Richard Witham (4 May 1913 – 1999) was a professional footballer who played in the Football League for Huddersfield Town, Blackpool and Oldham Athletic. He was born in Bowburn, County Durham.

References

1913 births
1999 deaths
English footballers
Footballers from County Durham
Association football defenders
English Football League players
Durham City A.F.C. players
Huddersfield Town A.F.C. players
Blackpool F.C. players
Oldham Athletic A.F.C. players
People from County Durham (district)